The Mumbai Central Prison, also referred to as Arthur Road Jail, was built in 1926, and is Mumbai's largest and oldest prison. It houses most of the city's prisoners. It was declared a Central Jail in 1972. Although its name was changed to Mumbai Central Prison, it is still often referred to as Arthur Road Jail. The jail occupies  of land.

Location
The jail is located near Jacob Circle/Sat Rasta, between the Mahalaxmi railway station and Chinchpokli railway station and the Jacob Circle monorail station in the southern part of the city. It is now surrounded by residential property renting for Rs 12–25,000/sq foot, while commercial property is leased for Rs 30–60,000/sq foot.

Conditions
The jail was originally built to accommodate 800 prisoners but the average number of inmates is 2900—far exceeding its capacity in terms of space, sanitation and other facilities. It is often reported that the jail is overcrowded, and there have been proposals to build another such facility in the eastern suburbs of Mankhurd to ease the load on the jail.

The State Human Rights Commission had often suggested that the prison be decongested. Furthermore, a committee which was appointed to inspect the security of the jail has suggested that the prison be shifted due to many high rise constructions around the jail.

In June 2021, during the COVID-19 pandemic, the superintendent of the prison wrote to BMC to ask them to start a vaccination drive for the prisoners.

In July 2021, eight new barracks were added to the jail which could house 200 additional inmates. There were several delays in construction, which lasted five years, due to shortage of funds. This was done in an attempt to alleviate the overcrowding situation, something that the prison authorities were frequently criticized for.

Prison violence 
The jail has seen instances of prison violence amongst gangs.

In 2006, a clash between the members of gangs belonging to Dawood Ibrahim and Chhota Rajan broke out. After this incident, the authorities started lodging opposing groups in different parts of the jail.

In 2010, a violent clash broke out between the gangster Abu Salem and Mustafa Dossa, who were the accused in the 1993 Bombay serial blasts, which let to Salem's face being slashed with a sharpened spoon.

Notable inmates 

 Sanjay Dutt, a Bollywood actor who was imprisoned for illegal possession of armed weapons
 Ajmal Kasab, a Pakistani terrorist and member of Lashkar-e-Taiba who took part in the 2008 Mumbai attacks
 Abu Salem, terrorist and organised crime leader
Aryan Khan, son of actor Shah Rukh Khan, was sent to this prison for drug related offenses
Maharashtra Home Minister, Anil Deshmukh of Maha Vikas Aghadi Government formed by SHIV SENA, NCP and INDIRA CONGRESS, was sent to this jail for running Extortion Racket conniving with Commissioner of Mumbai Police, Parambir Singh. 
Raj Kundra, British-Indian businessman, and husband of actress Shilpa Shetty was sent to this prison for a pornography case.

Popular culture
The prison features in Gregory David Roberts' award-winning book Shantaram, which details his life on the run and his time spent in Mumbai, including a stint in Arthur Road. Several scenes in Katherine Boo's Behind the Beautiful Forevers take place in the facility.

See also
 Harsul Central Jail
 Yerwada Central Jail

References

1926 establishments in India
Buildings and structures in Mumbai
Prisons in Maharashtra